Guggenheim Fellowships were awarded in 1988 to 280 people:

A
Marilyn McCord Adams
Chester A. Alper 	
Joel B. Altman 	
Patricia Rieff Anawalt 	
Stephen R. Anderson
T. J. Anderson
Richard N. Aslin

B
Annette C. Baier
Bonnie J. Blackburn
Brent Berlin
Carl David Benson
Christopher Benfey
Edward Bradford Burns
Eileen Blumenthal
Fakhri A. Bazzaz
Howard Brenner
James Lee Burke
Jeanne Bamberger
Jonathan French Beecher
Lee Knowlton Blessing
Leland S. Burns
Michael Brewster
Michael C. Blumenthal
Philip Benedict
Robert Turner Boyd
Roger David Blandford
Ross Bauer
Sara Sweezy Berry
Steve Brand
Suzanne Blier
T. Coraghessan Boyle
Thomas A. Brady

C
William A. Camfield
Jay Cantor
Jack Carnell
Arnaldo Córdova
Sucheng Chan
Jerome Colin Christensen
Elizabeth Ann Clark
Carmine Domenic Clemente
Carol J. Clover
Robert Brady Cochran II
Alan Dodd Code
Richard John Cole
Jules L. Coleman
Roy Colmer
Antoine Compagnon
Dimitri N. Coucouvanis
Ruth Schwartz Cowan
Jerry Allen Coyne
Pablo Antonio Cuadra

D
Michael James Dear
Marianne DeKoven
Deborah Digges
Elizabeth F. Diggs
David P. Dobkin
Louise Dolan
Alfredo Osvaldo Donoso
Laurence Dreyfus
Bruce M. Duffy
Richard Timothy Durrett
Robert W. Dutton

E
Richard A. Easterlin
Anthony S.G. Edwards
Gretel Ehrlich
Joseph J. Ellis
Jon Elster
Peter Entell
Martha N. Evans
Peter Brandt Evans

F
Gerd Faltings
Philip M. Fearnside
Thomas P. Fehlner
Stefano Fenoaltea
Norma Field
Jaroslav T. Folda
Charles William Fornara
Donald W. Forsyth
Thomas L. Friedman

G
Frantisek W. Galan
M. Catherine Gallagher
Brendan James Galvin
James Augustin Galvin
Michael James Gandolfi
Carlos A. García Canal
Magali García Ramis
Timothy Jackson Geller
Robert B. Gennis
Ernest B. Gilman
Janusz Glowacki
Glenn S. Goldberg
Betty Goodwin
Michael Jay Graetz
Anthony T. Grafton
Emily Rolfe Grosholz
Sidney T. Guberman
Victor William Guillemin
Richard F. Gustafson

H
Rachel Hadas 
Carol Haerer
Daniel Halpern
Patricia Hampl
Barbara A. Hanawalt
Geoffrey G. Harpham
James Burkett Hartle
Larry C. Heinemann
Susanna Heller
Edward Henderson
Linda Dalrymple Henderson
Juan Carlos Herken Krauer
Cynthia B. Herrup
Cheng-Teh James Huang
John Crandall Hudson
Sylvia Jean Huot
Isabelle Hyman

I
Graciela Iturbide

J
William M. Jackson
Margaret C. Jacob
Mary Longstaff Jacobus
Myra Jehlen
William D. Jones
Miguel José-Yacamán

K
Walter Emil Kaegi
Tamara Kamenszain
Peter Joachim Katzenstein
William Keach
Steven W. Keele
Bernice G. Kert
Alice Kessler-Harris
Philip Kitcher
William Klein
Fred S. Kleiner
Judith Pollack Klinman
Kenneth A. Kobland
Mimi Alma Ruth Koehl
Richard Karl Koehn
Harry Kondoleon
Rudy John Koshar
William B. Krantz
David M. Kreps
Richard F. Kuisel

L
Ernesto Laclau
Gabriel Laderman
Naomi R. Lamoreaux
Suzanne Lebsock
John Emmett Lesch
Wendy C. Lesser
Ronald L. Levao
Joseph M. Levine (1933-2008)
George A. Lindbeck
Scott Allen Lindroth
Donald Lipski
Jane S. Livingston
Jorge Simon Lomnitz Adler
Phillip Lopate
Reagan Louie
Thomas Lux

M
Pauline Alice Rubbelke Maier
Mary Biggar Main
Marilú Mallet
Roberta Thompson Manning
Patricio Manns
Richard Spencer Markovits
Jonathan Evan Maslow
John Norman Mather
Randall McLeod
Diane Wood Middlebrook
Bebe Miller
Jane R. Miller
Jayadev Misra
Eric H. Moe
Robert Ray Morgan
Michael Edward Moseley
Alexander Phoebus D. Mourelatos
Stephen Murray
Fred R. Myers

N
Gloria Naylor 	
Andrew Noren 	
Jack Richard Norton

O
Scarlett O'Phelan Godoy 
Elvira Amanda Orphée

P
Patricia Anne Parker
Robert B. Partridge
Sharon Patten
Jeffrey M. Perl
Edward M. Peters
Margot Peters
Stephen J. Petronio
Jayne Anne Phillips
Alexander Pines
Osmar Pinheiro de Souza Jr
Jorge Emilio Ponce-Hornos
Harold S. Powers
Francisco Thaine Prada
Donald Ross Prothero
Robert D. Putnam
Jon Pynoos

Q
David Quammen 	
David C. Queller

R
Gregory Rabassa 	
Anson G. Rabinbach 	
Mario Rajchenberg
Alberto Alvaro Ríos
Marcus Rediker
David Reed
Ramon J. Rhine
Jens Rieckmann
Luis Felipe Rodríguez
Wendy L. Rogers
Maria de Los Angeles Romero Frizzi
Michael Morris Rosbash
Morris Rosenberg
J. Philippe Rushton

S
Alberto Ruy Sanchez Lacy
Donald Gene Saari
David Warren Sabean
Pierre Saint-Amand
Dana A. Salvo
Juan Sanchez
Ed Parish Sanders
Lucy Freeman Sandler
Bernabé Santelices
Joseph William Santore
Valeria Sarmiento
Ernesto Carlos Schóó
Raymond P. Scheindlin
Jonathan Edward Schell
Allen Schick
Carl W. Schmid
Joanna Scott
David O. Sears
Ian Shapiro
Tobin Anthony Siebers
Lee A. Siegel
Eric D. Siggia
Joel H. Silbey
Sally R. Silvers
Barry Simon
Mona E. Simpson
Christine Smith
Jordan F. Smith
Karen Spalding
Elizabeth S. Spelke
Thomas G. Spiro
Keith W. F. Stavely
Jeanne Mager Stellman
Alexander Stephan
Gary P. Stephan
Harry S. Stout
Lynn Ray Sykes

T
Jorge Tacla
Sandra Annear Thompson
Lawrence A. Thornton 
Jean M. Tirole 
Alan Turner

U
Jeffrey Ullman

V
Mark Lindsey Van Stone
Carlos E. Vasco-Uribe 
Laura Volkerding

W
Anne M. Wagner
Melinda Jane Wagner
Marvalee H. Wake
David Walker
Don E. Wayne
Howard D. Weinbrot
Richard Wendorf
Scott Wheeler
Halbert L. White
James D. White
James P. White
Randall K. White
William H. Wiggins Jr
George C. Williams
John J. Winkler
Michael S. Witherell
Colin Allen Wraight
Cheng-Wen Wu
Robert Edward Wyatt

Y
James E. Young

Z
Jack Zipes

1988
1988 awards